José Marín (ca. 16191699) was a Spanish Baroque harpist, guitarist and composer noted for his secular songs, tonos humanos.
	
In 1644 he entered the Royal Convent of La Encarnación in Madrid as a tenor. He was a priest and cantor of the capilla real under Felipe IV and Carlos II. His career was marked by scandals and murder. He was sentenced to prison but escaped to regain respectability.

Works
Website:
http://www.JoseMarin.com
Songs
Corazon que en prision possibly refers to his own imprisonment.
Theatre music
music for zarzuelas by the dramatist Juan Bautista Diamante.

Selected discography
José Marin, "Tonos humanos", Montserrat Figueras, Arianna Savall, Rolf Lislevand, et al. Alia Vox AVSA9802

References

1610s births
1699 deaths
Spanish Baroque composers
Spanish male classical composers
Spanish classical guitarists
Spanish male guitarists
Spanish classical harpists
Spanish Roman Catholic priests
Spanish opera composers
Male opera composers
17th-century classical composers
17th-century male musicians